The 1954 FIFA World Cup qualification Group 9 contained Italy and Egypt.

Table

Matches

 

Italy qualified.

Team stats

Head coach: Technical Commission:  Lajos Czeizler,  Angelo Schiavio,  Silvio Piola

Head coach:  Abdulrahman Fawzi

References

External links
FIFA official page
RSSSF – 1954 World Cup Qualification
Allworldcup

9
Qual
1953–54 in Egyptian football